St. Raphael's Convent Girls High School is a Kerala Government aided Christian school run by Carmelites, located in Ollur, Thrissur. The school was started in 1942 with 13 classes and now have
classes till secondary level.

Famous alumnae
 Gopika - Malayalam actress
 Vani Viswanath - Malayalam actress

References

St. Raphael's Convent Girls High School
Carmelite educational institutions
Christian schools in Kerala
Girls' schools in Kerala
High schools and secondary schools in Kerala
Educational institutions established in 1942
1942 establishments in India